The Society of St Gregory is an organization devoted to Roman Catholic church music in the British Isles. It was founded in 1929.

It aims to further the study and understanding of church music and, more widely, liturgy, with a view to promoting the active participation of the people in accordance with the teaching of the church. As such, the Society of St Gregory promotes the use of all forms of music, from ancient to contemporary, which engage people in prayer.

References

External links
 Society of St Gregory

Arts organisations based in the United Kingdom
1929 establishments in the United Kingdom
Organizations established in 1929